Joe Russo (December 27, 1901 in Racine, Wisconsin – June 10, 1934 in
Bristol, Pennsylvania) was an American racecar driver active in the 1930s. He died in a hospital in Bristol, Pennsylvania after a crash at Langhorne Speedway.

Russo was known for performing a stunt of driving around the Indianapolis Motor Speedway blindfolded.

His son, Eddie Russo, and his brother, Paul Russo have also raced at the Indianapolis 500.

Indy 500 results

References

1901 births
1934 deaths
Indianapolis 500 drivers
Sportspeople from Racine, Wisconsin
Racing drivers from Wisconsin
Racing drivers who died while racing
Sports deaths in Pennsylvania
AAA Championship Car drivers